Eliane Elias Plays Jobim is the fifth studio album by Brazilian jazz artist Eliane Elias. It was released in 1990 via Blue Note label.

Background
Eliane Elias is considered one of the great interpreters of Antonio Carlos Jobim's music.ref? She has recorded two albums solely dedicated to the works of the composer: Eliane Elias Plays Jobim and Eliane Elias Sings Jobim. The musicians that joined her for this record were Eddie Gomez on bass, Jack DeJohnette on drums, and Nana Vasconcelos on percussion. While most of her records had previously been instrumental, Elias introduced her voice on this album and has employed vocals ever since.

Reception
Alvaro Neder of AllMusic stated, "This is not an album for those die-hard bossa fans. These popular Jobim tunes all were revisited by Elias with the goal of bridging the gap between Brazilian music and jazz; that goal was achieved. She affirms herself in this complex idiom, resulting in an album that can be enjoyed by any jazz connoisseur."

Track listing

Personnel
 Band
 Eliane Elias – piano, vocals, editing, producing
 Eddie Gómez – bass
 Jack DeJohnette – drums
 Naná Vasconcelos – percussion
 Production
 James Farber – recording engineer
 Malcolm Pollack – editing
 Randy Brecker – producer
 Christine Martin – executive producer

References

External links

1990 albums
Eliane Elias albums
Blue Note Records albums